Robert Burren Morgan (October 5, 1925 – July 16, 2016) was an American politician. He was a Democratic United States Senator from the state of North Carolina for a single term from 1975 until 1981.

Life and career
Born in Lillington, North Carolina, Morgan attended Lillington public schools and later East Carolina College and Wake Forest University School of Law.

Morgan's political career began early when political leaders in his home county of Harnett County, including highly respected Democratic stalwart Veneble Baggett, visited him at the Wake Forest Law School and urged him to run for Clerk of Court. Morgan did so and was elected. After building a reputation in that office, he went into the private practice of law. His skill as a trial lawyer caused his practice to grow, and he soon established a reputation that extended across the state. Personal injury, real property and antitrust law were among his specialties.

He next ran for the North Carolina State Senate and won. He rose to the Senate's highest office, President Pro Tempore, and chaired key committees.

In 1968, Morgan challenged long-time incumbent Attorney General Wade Bruton in the Democratic Party primary, defeated him, and then won the General Election. He served one four-year term and then was re-elected. Under Morgan, the office was split into five divisions each responsible to a deputy attorney general, with a sixth division later added. He served two years of that term and then resigned to run for the U.S. Senate.

Early in his political career, Morgan was considered a supporter of segregation because of his allegiance to his former Wake Forest law professor, politician I. Beverly Lake, Sr., who ran an unsuccessful pro-segregation campaign for governor in 1960 against the progressive supporter of civil rights, Terry Sanford.
But later, as an influential state senator, as North Carolina attorney general from 1969 to 1974, and as the successful candidate to succeed Democratic U.S. Senator Sam Ervin, Morgan was considered a moderate.

After winning the Democratic primary for U.S. Senate in 1974, Morgan resigned as attorney general effective August 26. He then won the general election over Republican William Stevens, garnering 63% of the vote.

Morgan was defeated for re-election in 1980 by Republican John Porter East in an extremely close race. Morgan returned to the practice of law and also served as director of North Carolina's State Bureau of Investigation under Attorney General Lacy Thornburg.

From 2000 to 2003, Morgan served as founding president of the North Carolina Center for Voter Education, a Raleigh, North Carolina based nonprofit and nonpartisan organization that seeks to increase civic engagement in North Carolina. Morgan was president emeritus of that organization.

Morgan died at the age of 90 at his home in Buies Creek, North Carolina on July 16, 2016.

References

Works cited

External links 

 Civil Rights Greensboro: Robert Morgan 
 Robert Morgan Papers (#268), East Carolina Manuscript Collection, J. Y. Joyner Library, East Carolina University
 Historical Marker for Robert B. Morgan located in Lillington, North Carolina

1925 births
2016 deaths
People from Lillington, North Carolina
East Carolina University alumni
Wake Forest University School of Law alumni
North Carolina Attorneys General
Democratic Party North Carolina state senators
Democratic Party United States senators from North Carolina
United States Navy personnel of the Korean War
United States Navy personnel of World War II
United States Air Force officers
United States Air Force reservists
United States Navy officers
United States Navy reservists
People from Buies Creek, North Carolina